Nothopegia heyneana is a species of plant in the family Anacardiaceae. It is endemic to India.

References

 http://biotik.org/india/species/n/nothhehe/nothhehe_en.html

Flora of India (region)
heyneana
Near threatened plants
Taxonomy articles created by Polbot